Snatch may refer to:

Art and entertainment
 Snatch, an album by Howie B
 Snatch, a first-wave punk duo formed by Judy Nylon and Patti Palladin
 "Snatch" (Space Ghost Coast to Coast), a television episode
 Snatch (film), a 2000 British crime comedy film
 Snatch (TV series), a 2017 TV series based on the film
 Anagrams  (also known as Anagram, Grabscrab, Pirate Scrabble, Snatch, Taking, and Word Making), a tile-based word game that involves rearranging letter tiles to form words

Vehicles
 Snatch Land Rover, a paramilitary vehicle
 USS Snatch (ARS-27), a 1944 ship

Other uses
 Snatch (weightlifting), one of two events in Olympic weight lifting
  Snatch, a derogatory slang term for the vagina
 Snatch theft, a type of crime

See also
 Grab (disambiguation)
 Snatched (disambiguation)